Benjamín Ayala Velázquez (born 7 October 1964) is a Mexican politician from the Institutional Revolutionary Party. From 2000 to 2003 he served as Deputy of the LVIII Legislature of the Mexican Congress representing Coahuila.

References

1964 births
Living people
Politicians from Torreón
Institutional Revolutionary Party politicians
21st-century Mexican politicians
Autonomous University of Coahuila alumni
Academic staff of the Panamerican University
Deputies of the LVIII Legislature of Mexico
Members of the Chamber of Deputies (Mexico) for Coahuila